The 1952–53 SM-sarja season was the 22nd season of the SM-sarja, the top level of ice hockey in Finland. 12 teams participated in the league, and TBK Tampere won the championship.

Regular season

Group A

Group B

3rd place 
 TPS Turku – HIFK Helsinki 10:6/4:3

Final 
 TBK Tampere – Tarmo Hämeenlinna 5:4/3:2

External links
 Season on hockeyarchives.info

Fin
Liiga seasons
1952–53 in Finnish ice hockey